Pan Fu (22 November 1883 – 12 September 1936) was a Chinese politician and premier of the Republic of China from 1927 to 1928 during the Beiyang government. He was the acting Minister of Finance from 24 July 1920 to 11 August 1920, and again from 11 June 1921 to 28 October 1921 when he stood in for Li Shiwei. He was finance minister in his own right from 1 October 1926 to 12 January 1927. Fu became premier and minister for transportation on 12 January 1927 and served until 3 June 1928.

See also
 Beiyang Government

References

1883 births
1961 deaths
Finance Ministers of the Republic of China
Politicians from Jining
Premiers of the Republic of China
Republic of China politicians from Shandong